Josef Henselmann (16 August 1898 in Sigmaringen – 19 January 1987) was a German sculptor and professor.

Henselmann was born in Sigmaringen, Province of Hohenzollern. After studying at the Gymnasium he completed an apprenticeship to be a wood sculptor. After the First World War he was a student at the Munich Academy. He taught at the Münchner Staatsschule für angewandte Kunst (Munich School for applied arts) and from 1946 was a professor at the Munich Academy, where he served an extensive period of time as Academy President. Henselmann died in Munich.

He was married to the painter Marianne Henselmann, née Euler (born 1903 in Aschaffenburg; died 2002 in Munich), with whom he had two children.

Selection of works 
 High Altar in the St. Stephan's Cathedral in Passau
 Chorbogencruzifix in the Munich Frauenkirche
 Rindermarktbrunnen in Munich
 Vierjahreszeitenbrunnen in Sigmaringen
 Christophorus in der Prinzregentenstraße in Munich
 Trumpeter of Säckingen
as well as numerous other works in the Bavarian and Upper Swabian region.

 Hygieia in the foyer of Jodquellen AG in Bad Tölz

Selection of awards 
 Großer Preussischer Staatspreis (Grand Prussian State Prize)
 Bayerischer Verdienstorden (Bavarian Order of Merit)
 Bayerischer Maximiliansorden für Wissenschaft und Kunst (Bavarian Maximilian Order for Science and Art)
 Förderpreis im Bereich Bildende Kunst der Landeshauptstadt München (Translates as "Munich Fellowship of the Fine Arts") (1957)

1898 births
1987 deaths
People from Sigmaringen
People from the Province of Hohenzollern
Academic staff of the Academy of Fine Arts, Munich
Academy of Fine Arts, Munich alumni
20th-century German sculptors
20th-century German male artists
German male sculptors